The 1967 Segunda División de Chile was the 16th season of the Segunda División de Chile.

Deportes Concepción was the tournament's champion.

Table

See also
Chilean football league system

References

External links
 RSSSF 1967

Segunda División de Chile (1952–1995) seasons
Primera B
Chil